Snow Creek Glacier is located on Little Annapurna in the Stuart Range, U.S. state of Washington. Snow Creek Glacier is within the Alpine Lakes Wilderness of Wenatchee National Forest and the Enchantment Lakes region. Snow Creek Glacier consists of several small glacial remnants (glacieret), one of which terminates at Isolation Lake.

See also
List of glaciers in the United States

References

Glaciers of the North Cascades
Glaciers of Chelan County, Washington
Glaciers of Washington (state)